A board of supervisors is a governmental body that oversees the operation of county government in the U.S. states of Arizona, California, Iowa, Mississippi, Virginia, and Wisconsin, as well as 16 counties in New York. There are equivalent agencies in other states.

Similar to a city council, a board of supervisors has legislative, executive, and quasi-judicial powers. The important difference is that a county is an administrative division of a state, whereas a city is a municipal corporation; thus, counties implement and, as necessary, refine the local application of state law and public policy, while cities produce and implement their own local laws and public policy (subject to the overriding authority of state law). Often they are concerned with the provision of courts, jails, public health and public lands.

Legislative powers

Boards may pass and repeal laws, generally called ordinances. Depending on the state, and the subject matter of the law, these laws may apply to the entire county or to only unincorporated areas not located within the jurisdiction of a city. The board is also responsible for approving the county budget. County governments may collect state taxes and, in some states, they may also levy taxes, such as property or sales tax.

In some states, including Michigan, and in some New York counties until recently, county governing boards were composed of township (Michigan) or town (New York) "supervisors". These are the chief elected officials of each civil township. Boards of Supervisors were originally composed of the various town/township supervisors from across the county. This system gave every township one vote on the county board regardless of its population, resulting in less populous townships having influence in decision-making that was disproportionate to their populations.

Both Michigan and New York changed how they elected county boards by dividing counties into single member districts, drawn so that each district has more or less the same sized population or with each township's vote weighted by population, under order from the Warren Court (see Reynolds v. Sims). In Michigan, the new board model was implemented in 1968. The name "Board of Supervisors" was changed to "Board of Commissioners" in 1970 to avoid confusion with township government (where the term "Supervisor" was still used). In New York, the new boards were called "county legislatures" (and their members, "county legislators"), but not every county has adopted this system. Those that retained the old boards of supervisors after the 1960s assigned each member a proportional vote based on the population represented.

Executive powers

Boards oversee county departments. Generally, this is done under the aegis of a county administrator or county executive. The power of the executive to act independently depends on the county charter. The administrator or executive usually has the authority over the day-to-day operations of the county's departments. Many boards independently appoint department heads, while other boards delegate that authority to the administrator or executive. Some department heads, like the sheriff or district attorney, may be elected separately by the electorate; however, the board still controls these departments' budgets.

In the City and County of San Francisco, a consolidated city-county government, the Board of Supervisors does dual duty as a county board of control and a city council, and the mayor is simultaneously city head of government and county executive.

Quasi-judicial powers

In some states, the board is the final arbiter of decisions made by commissions underneath a board. This often involves land use planning issues.

Other states

In some states the equivalent body to a Board of Supervisors is called the county council or county commission. For Louisiana parishes, the equivalent body is a Police Jury, while in Kentucky the equivalent is called the Fiscal Court. In Nebraska, some counties are governed by a board of supervisors while others are governed by a county commission. In New York, counties are governed by a county legislature, a board of representatives, or a board of supervisors.

In Pennsylvania, "Board of Supervisors" is the name of the body governing townships of the second class that have not adopted a home rule charter.  By default, a Pennsylvania township board of supervisors consists of three members, elected at large in odd-numbered years to staggered six-year terms.  Voters of a township of the second class can vote to expand the board to five members. By contrast, townships of the first class elect a Board of Commissioners, either consisting of 5 at large members in townships without wards, or choosing one member from each ward (15 being the maximum number of wards permitted).

See also

General
 Board of Selectmen (New England)

Individual county boards

Arizona

Apache County
Cochise County
Coconino County 
Gila County
Graham County
Greenlee County 
La Paz County 
Maricopa
Mohave County
Navajo County
Pima County
Pinal County
Santa Cruz County
Yavapai County
Yuma County

California

 Alameda
 Butte
 Contra Costa
 Imperial
 Kern
 Los Angeles
 Marin
 Monterey
 Nevada
 Orange
 Plumas
 Riverside
 Sacramento
 San Diego
 San Francisco
 San Mateo
 Santa Clara
 Santa Cruz
 Sonoma
 Ventura

Virginia

 Albemarle
 Arlington
 Chesterfield
 Fairfax
 Loudoun
 Prince William

Wisconsin

 Milwaukee

References

Committees
County governing bodies in the United States
Legislatures